HMS Stubbington was a  which saw service with the Royal Navy during the Cold War. Built by Camper & Nicholson, Portsmouth, she was launched on 8 August 1956. She served as a minesweeper in the Mediterranean and the Middle East in the 1950s and 1960s, and in the Royal Navy Reserve under the name HMS Montrose from 1972 to 1976. She then was used for Fishery Protection duties. Stubbington was broken up in 1989.

Construction and design
Stubbington was laid down at Camper & Nicholson's Portsmouth yard on 26 October 1954 and  launched on 8 August 1956. She was commissioned on 30 July 1957.

As one of the later Ton-class ships, Stubbington was fitted with an enclosed bridge and tripod mast rather than the open bridge and lattice mast fitted to earlier ships.

Armament consisted of a single Bofors 40 mm anti-aircraft gun forward and two Oerlikon 20 mm cannon aft. Minesweeping equipment included wire sweeps for sweeping moored contact mines and acoustic or magnetic sweeps for dealing with influence mines. The ship had a crew of 27 in peacetime and 39 in wartime.

Service
On commissioning, Stubbington joined the 108th Mine Sweeping Squadron based in Malta. She was based at Aden in 1961–62 before returning to the Mediterranean, joining the 7th Mine Sweeping Squadron.

On 15 January 1968, an earthquake struck Sicily, with Stubbington being deployed in relief efforts. In May 1969, after a refit at Gibraltar, she returned to British waters, serving as a Navigation tender at Portsmouth, and in June 1972 she joined the Tay division of the Royal Navy Reserve, based at Dundee as part of the 10th Mine Counter Measures Squadron, and was renamed HMS Montrose while attached to the Tay Division.

In 1976 she returned to her original name, and in June 1977, after a 14-month refit at Chatham Dockyard, joined the Fishery Protection Squadron. She was refitted again in 1979, before returning to fishery protection duties. She remained part of the Fishery Protection Squadron in 1986. She was sold for scrap in 1989, arriving at Bilbao on 26 September 1989 for breaking up.

References

Publications
 
 
 
 
 
 
 
 

 

Ton-class minesweepers of the Royal Navy
Ships built in Portsmouth
1956 ships
Cold War minesweepers of the United Kingdom